Shir Ali or Shir'ali may refer to:
 Shirali, Kermanshah
 Shir Ali, Andika, Khuzestan Province
 Shir Ali, Behbahan, Khuzestan Province
 Shir Ali, Lali, Khuzestan Province
 Shir Ali, Sistan and Baluchestan

See also
Cheshmeh-ye Shir Ali
Khor-e Shir Ali
Shirali